Cristian Zenoni (born 23 April 1977) is an Italian former professional footballer who played as a full-back. He is the twin brother of former footballer Damiano Zenoni.

Club career
Zenoni started his career at his native club Atalanta B.C., joining the team's youth system in 1994. After being promoted to the first team, in 1996, Zenoni was loaned to Serie C1 side A.C. Pistoiese for a season in order to gain playing time and experience. The following season, he made his Serie A debut with Atalanta on 5 October 1997, in a 1–1 draw against rivals Brescia; in total he made 17 appearances throughout the season. Despite his promising performances for the club, he was unable to help Atalanta avoid relegation to Serie B. He later helped Atalanta gain promotion to Serie A during the 1999–2000 season, and the next season, both he and his brother Damiano established themselves as two of the most exciting young full-backs in the league.

Described by press as a promising young prospect, in June 2001, Cristian transferred to A.C. Milan along with Massimo Donati for 60 billion Italian lire in a cash plus player deal (the player was majority), but quickly transferred to Juventus F.C. as part of Filippo Inzaghi's transfer in the opposite direction, he was tagged for 30 billion Italian lire or about €15.6 million. He signed a five-year contract. In the summer of 2003, Zenoni was loaned to U.C. Sampdoria with an option to sign permanently for €10 million. He was loaned out to the club once again in the summer of 2004, and at the end of the 2004–05 season, after almost helping the team qualify for the UEFA Champions League, he was signed permanently by Sampdoria for €1 million.

After several seasons in Genoa, in 2008, Zenoni joined Bologna. In 2010, he moved to AlbinoLeffe, where he remained until 2011. He ended his career after spending the 2011–12 season with Monza, in Lega Pro. In total, he made 546 professional appearances, scoring 10 goals.

International career
After representing the Italy U21 national team three times between 1998 and 1999, Zenoni was capped at senior level for the Italy national team twice, making his debut in a 2–1 friendly home loss against Argentina, on 28 February 2001, under manager Giovanni Trapattoni.

He was recalled by Roberto Donadoni, for his first match as Italy's coach, in August 2006. Zenoni played the friendly match, his second and final Italy appearance losing 2–0 to Croatia on 16 August, as starter.

Style of play
A hard-working and athletic team player, Zenoni was regarded as a talented and promising young prospect, and as one of the best players in his position in Italy in his youth. He usually played as a right sided full-back, although he was known for his offensive prowess, stamina, and ability to cover the right flank, and was also capable of playing in more advanced positions on occasion, as a right winger.

Personal life
Cristian is the twin brother of former footballer Damiano Zenoni.

Honours
Juventus
Serie A: 2001–02, 2002–03
Supercoppa Italiana: 2002

References

External links
 Lega Serie A profile

1977 births
Living people
Sportspeople from the Province of Bergamo
Italy international footballers
Italian footballers
Atalanta B.C. players
U.S. Pistoiese 1921 players
A.C. Milan players
Juventus F.C. players
U.C. Sampdoria players
Bologna F.C. 1909 players
U.C. AlbinoLeffe players
A.C. Monza players
Serie A players
Serie B players
Serie C players
Italian twins
Twin sportspeople
Association football defenders
People from Trescore Balneario
Footballers from Lombardy